The Samuel Gilmer House is a historic house and farm property at 2410 East Main Street, just outside the Lebanon town limits in Russell County, Virginia, United States.  It is a two-story brick building, set on a limestone foundation, with a side gable roof.  A single-story porch extends across the front, supported by round columns.  The front is three bays wide, with a center entrance topped by a transom window.  The interior follows a typical center-hall plan, and has much original Federal-period finish, including the staircase and fireplace mantels.  The property includes the ruins of an 1848 covered bridge that once spanned Big Cedar Creek.  Built about 1820, it is one of the few Federal period houses to survive in southwestern Virginia.

The house was listed on the National Register of Historic Places in 2015.

See also
National Register of Historic Places listings in Russell County, Virginia

References

Houses on the National Register of Historic Places in Virginia
Federal architecture in Virginia
Houses completed in 1820
Houses in Russell County, Virginia
National Register of Historic Places in Russell County, Virginia